"Jeopardy" is a song released by the Greg Kihn Band, from their 1983 album Kihnspiracy. It was the band's only Top 10 hit on the Billboard Hot 100 singles chart, reaching number 2 in May 1983 (behind Michael Jackson's "Beat It"), and also hit number 1 on the Billboard Hot Club Dance Play chart for two weeks a month earlier. The song also reached number 63 on the UK Singles Chart, becoming the band's only charting song in the UK. The song is written in the key of D minor.

Parody

A parody of the song, titled "I Lost on Jeopardy", was released by "Weird Al" Yankovic on his 1984 album "Weird Al" Yankovic in 3-D. Kihn made a cameo appearance in the song's music video, driving the car into which Yankovic is thrown after being "ejected" from the Jeopardy! game show, parodying the end of his own video. The car's license plate reads "LOSER" instead of "LIPS". The bride still pops the cork of the champagne bottle and the video ends. Art Fleming and Don Pardo—host and announcer, respectively, of the original version of Jeopardy!—also make cameo appearances.

Charts

Weekly charts

Year-end charts

See also
List of number-one dance singles of 1983 (U.S.)

References

1983 singles
1983 songs
Greg Kihn songs
Beserkley Records singles
American power pop songs
Songs written by Greg Kihn